This is the complete discography of the British mathcore band Rolo Tomassi.

Albums

Studio albums

Compilation albums

Extended plays

Split releases

Singles

Covers
 Deftones's "Digital Bath" on Kerrang!'s Ultimate Rock Heroes (2015)

Music videos
 "I Love Turbulence" (2008)
 "Oh, Hello Ghost" (2009)
 "Beatrotter" (2010)
 "Party Wounds" (2010)
 "Ex Luna Scientia" (2012)
 "Howl" (2013)
 "Opalescent" (2015)
 "The Embers" (2015)
 "Rituals" (2017)
 "Balancing The Dark" (2017)
 "Aftermath" (2018)
 "A Flood of Light" (2019)
 "Cloaked" (2021)
 "Drip" (2021)
 "Closer" (2022)

References

Discographies of British artists
Punk rock discographies